Nicole Teresa de Jesús Abreu (born 11 January 2000) is a Dominican footballer who plays as a midfielder for UNPHU and the Dominican Republic women's national team.

International career
De Jesús has appeared for the Dominican Republic at the 2020 CONCACAF Women's Olympic Qualifying Championship qualification.

References 

2000 births
Living people
Dominican Republic women's footballers
Women's association football midfielders
Dominican Republic women's international footballers